Björn Vlasbom (born 28 January 1990) is a former Dutch professional footballer who played as a midfielder. He formerly played for Sparta Rotterdam and FC Dordrecht.

External links
 Voetbal International

1990 births
Living people
Dutch footballers
Sparta Rotterdam players
FC Dordrecht players
Eerste Divisie players
Footballers from Dordrecht

Association football midfielders